The 3rd European Athletics Championships were held from 22 August to 25 August 1946 in the Bislett Stadion in Oslo, Norway. For the first time it was a combined event for men and women, and for the first time a city in Scandinavia hosted the championships.  Contemporaneous reports on the event were given in the Glasgow Herald.

Two of the women's medalists from France underwent sex change later.  Claire Brésolles became Pierre Brésolles, and Léa Caurla became Léon Caurla.

Men's results
Complete results were published.

Track

 The marathon at the 1946 European Championships was completed over a course measuring 40.1 km, 2 km shorter than the official marathon distance.

Field

Women's results

Track

Field

Medal table

Participation
According to an unofficial count, 354 athletes from 20 countries participated in the event, one athlete more than the official number of 353 as published.

 (11)
 (29)
 (23)
 (20)
 (31)
 (5)
 (11)
 (10)
 (1)
 (15)
 (2)
 (5)
 (17)
 (38)
 (18)
 (19)
 (54)
 (14)
 (24)
 (7)

References

Results

External links 
 EAA
 Athletix
 The event at SVT's open archive 

 
European Athletics Championships
European Athletics Championships
International athletics competitions hosted by Norway
European Athletics Championships
International sports competitions in Oslo
1946 in European sport
1940s in Oslo
August 1946 sports events in Europe